The AdventHealth 400 is a NASCAR Cup Series race held at Kansas Speedway in Kansas City, Kansas. Kansas received a second date beginning in 2011 part of a NASCAR schedule realignment; with the other one being the Hollywood Casino 400, the thirty-second race of the season. Kurt Busch is the defending winner.

History

The inaugural STP 400 was held on June 5, 2011. Like the fall race at Kansas, the distance of the race was 400.5 miles (644.542 km). Brad Keselowski won the inaugural running of the race ahead of Dale Earnhardt Jr. after saving fuel. Unlike 2011, the 2012 race was moved to April 22, 2012, to allow more time for the Kansas Speedway to complete the track's reconfiguration. During the 2012 STP 400, A. J. Allmendinger won the pole position with a time of 30.683 seconds, but Denny Hamlin won the race after passing Martin Truex Jr. For 2013, the race remained as the eighth race of the season in April, and was held on April 21, 2013.

In 2014, the race swapped dates with the Bojangles' Southern 500 and was held in May under the lights for the first time. In 2020, the race was moved to a Sunday afternoon time and the weekend after the Coca-Cola 600 at Charlotte, but the COVID-19 pandemic resulted in it being postponed to July 23 as a Thursday night event.

The race has undergone various name changes throughout its history. After being known as the STP 500 from 2011 to 2013, it was renamed the "5-hour Energy 400 Benefiting Special Operations Warrior Foundation" in 2014. Nickelodeon sponsored the 2015 race via the SpongeBob SquarePants television show, followed by GoBowling.com from 2016 to 2017. KC Masterpiece and Digital Ally respectively assumed naming rights in 2018 and 2019, followed by O'Reilly Auto Parts' Super Start Batteries brand in 2020.

The title sponsorship for the race changed again in 2021 from Super Start Batteries to Busch Beer, one of NASCAR's premier partners. The name of the race itself was announced as the "Busch Name This Race 400", as the company announced that fans would have the opportunity to choose another name for the race through a contest on their website. Fans paid $1 to participate, which went to the non-profit charity Farm Rescue. The winning name was "Buschy McBusch Race 400".

Past winners

Notes
2015: Race started on Saturday and finished shortly after midnight on Sunday due to rain delays.
2019: Race was extended due to a NASCAR overtime finish
2020: Race postponed from May 31 to July 23 due to the COVID-19 pandemic.
2021 Busch Beer, held a contest to name the 2021 Spring race. The name, Buschy McBusch Race 400 was picked through a contest. Kyle Busch won on his 36th birthday.

Multiple winners (drivers)

Multiple winners (teams)

Manufacturer wins

See also
2022 AdventHealth 400

References

External links
 

2011 establishments in Kansas
 
Recurring sporting events established in 2011
NASCAR Cup Series races
Annual sporting events in the United States